Mateus Norton Gomes Chaves (born 19 July 1996), simply known as Mateus Norton, is a Brazilian professional footballer who plays as a midfielder for Bento Gonçalves.

References

External links

Mateus Norton at ZeroZero

1996 births
Living people
Brazilian footballers
Brazilian expatriate footballers
Association football midfielders
Clube Esportivo Aimoré players
Fluminense FC players
FC Zorya Luhansk players
Itumbiara Esporte Clube players
Clube Esportivo Bento Gonçalves players
Campeonato Brasileiro Série A players
Ukrainian Premier League players
Brazilian expatriate sportspeople in Ukraine
Expatriate footballers in Ukraine